Lusadzor or Mehdibayli is a village de facto in the Askeran Province of the breakaway Republic of Artsakh, de jure in the Khojaly District of Azerbaijan, in the disputed region of Nagorno-Karabakh.

Toponymy 
The village was known as Mekhdishen during the Soviet period.

History 
During the Soviet period, the village was part of the Askeran District of the Nagorno-Karabakh Autonomous Oblast.

Historical heritage sites 
Historical heritage sites in and around the village include a settlement, chapel-shrine and tombs from the 2nd–1st millennia BCE, as well as the 19th-century church of Surb Astvatsatsin.

Economy and culture 
The population is mainly engaged in agriculture and animal husbandry. As of 2015, the village has a municipal building, a house of culture, a school, and a medical centre.

Demographics 
The village has an ethnic Armenian-majority population, had 177 inhabitants in 2005, and 177 inhabitants in 2015.

References

External links 
 

Populated places in Askeran Province
Populated places in Khojaly District